Autosticha ansata is a moth in the family Autostichidae. It was described by Edward Meyrick in 1931. It is found in Chennai, India.

References

Moths described in 1931
Autosticha
Moths of Asia